Lt. Gen. Bhopinder Singh (born 30 June 1946) is the former Lieutenant Governor of The Andaman and Nicobar Islands and Pondicherry and an Indian Army officer who has been awarded the PVSM. He was the former military secretary to president K. R. Narayanan and to President A. P. J. Abdul Kalam. He was the former military, naval and air attaché for East and Southern Africa headquartered at Addis Ababa. 

He was the former Lieutenant Governor of the Andaman and Nicobar Islands. Following the resignation of Mukut Mithi as Lieutenant Governor of Puducherry, Singh was appointed to replace him on 13 March 2008 and sworn in on 15 March.

In the year 2017, he published his book Bayoneting with Opinions and in 2019 published another book Continuing Opinions in Difficult Times. 

He is an alumnus of the National Defence Academy. He currently resides in Chandigarh.

References

External links
 Profile on Andaman ad Nicobar website

1946 births
Living people
Military personnel from Allahabad
People from Chandigarh
Lieutenant governors of the Andaman and Nicobar Islands
Indian generals
Lieutenant Governors of Puducherry
Recipients of the Param Vishisht Seva Medal